Euclides Varela (born 6 April 1982) is a Cape Verdean long-distance runner.

Career
Varela first competed for Cape Verde at the 2003 IAAF World Indoor Championships in Birmingham where he placed 21st in heats of the 3000 metres in a time of 8:29.10. Seven months later at the 2003 All-Africa Games in Abuja, Nigeria, he finished 13th in the 5000 metres with a time of 14:53.83. In March 2004 at the World Indoor Championships in Budapest, Varela recorded his personal best time in the 3000 metres with an 8:19.17, a then national record. Five months at the 2004 Ibero-American Championships in Athletics in Huelva, Varela finished 9th in the 5000 metres with PB of 14:26.37. At the 2006 Lusophony Games in Macau, he completed in the half marathon which was won by his fellow countryman Nelson Cruz. Some four years later, at the 2010 Ibero-American Championships in San Fernando, Spain Varela place 10th in the 5000 metres in 15:29.61. At the 2010 edition of the São Silvestre da Amadora in Lisbon, Varela finished in 4th place in 10 km run recording a national record time of 29:27.

Personal bests
Below is Euclides Varela's personal-best times

References

1982 births
Living people
Cape Verdean male long-distance runners
Athletes (track and field) at the 2003 All-Africa Games
African Games competitors for Cape Verde